Kususa is an electronic dance DJ and producer duo originating from Durban, South Africa, consisting of Joshua Sokweba known as Kunzima Theology and Mncedi Tshicila known as Samurai Yasusa. They create Electronic dance music containing elements of house, afro beat, techno and African music. The duo's name "Kususa", is both a combination of the pair's stage names and a word which, when roughly translated into the South African language of Shona, means "to start over".

History
Kususa started producing and DJing together in 2016 when they worked on their debut EP titled Kusuka Sukela, which was later released in 2017 by the United Kingdom record label, DM Recordings. In early 2017, they released a remix for the single Traveller by South African singer Lizwi and producer DeMajor, which was nominated in the 2017 Dance Music Awards South Africa, for Remix of the Year and was also featured on Black Coffee’s Ibiza 17 Appreciation Mix and later in 2018 featured on Defected Records's Ibiza 2018 Compilation mixed by Sam Divine. In that same year, their remix Feel It Now by Cornelius SA, featuring singer Jackie Queens, was nominated in the 2018 South Africa Music Awards, for Remix of the Year. The duo was also nominated for Best producer.

In early 2019, the duo performed at the Cape Town Electronic Music Festival which took place at the Castle of Good Hope. Later that year they performed at Ultra South Africa alongside Black Coffee.

Members
Joshua Sokweba  
Mncedi Tshicila

Awards and nominations

Discography
 Kusuka Sukela (2017)
 Icilongo (2017)
 Inkinobo (2017)
 I See You EP (2018)

References

External links
 
Kususa on Discogs

South African electronic music groups
Electronic dance music musicians
Electronic dance music DJs
Electronic music duos
South African musicians
South African DJs